Goli Soda is a 2014 Indian Tamil-language drama film written and directed by S.D. Vijay Milton, who handled the Cinematography as well. Produced by his brother Bharath Seeni under Roughnote Production, the film stars Kishore, Sree Raam, Pakoda Pandi, and Murugesh of Pasanga fame. The film was distributed by N. Lingusamy's Thirrupathi Brothers and released on 24 January 2014 to critical acclaim. The film narrates the story of four boys who work and live together in a market. The film was remade in Kannada with the same name and in Telugu as Evadu Thakkuva Kadu in 2019. Goli Soda 2, featuring an entirely distinct cast, was released in June 2018.

Plot 
Set against the backdrop of Koyambedu market, the film revolves around the lives of four young boys: Pulli, Saetu, Sithappa and Kuttimani. They work as coolies, and earn their bread by working as lifters. They lift and transport vegetable goods to various shops. One such shop is owned by Aachi, who treats the boys like her sons. The boys are carefree and do not worry about their future, and have fun by teasing and looking at schoolgirls who pass by. They befriend a girl named Vanmathi alias ATM, who assists them in finding a new friend, who turns out to be Aachi's daughter Yamini. They all become friends and hang out together. One day Aachi tells the boys that they do not have an identity and asks how long will they live like this. She advises them to do something that will give them an identity and let them earn some respect. They decide to start a mess in the market, where so many people will have access. Aachi helps them get an old godown from Naidu, a rich Dada who controls the market. Naidu lets them have the place for free for now and says he will collect the rent later. The boys start the mess and it becomes an instant hit, earning them money and respect. The boys feel that they have now got an identity as the owners of Aachi mess.

Things take a turn, when Mayil (R. K. Vijay Murugan), Naidu's cousin, starts using the mess for his own recreational purpose during the night. The boys allow him first due to their respect for Naidu, but later on, Mayil uses the mess for wrong purposes. One night, Mayil assaults a woman in the mess. Sithappa is upset with this and orders Mayil to get out of the mess immediately. Infuriated, Mayil beats him and sends him back. The other boys learn of this, and the next day, they come to the mess and find it still locked. Mayil is still in the mess with a hangover and has made a complete mess of the place. The boys get angry and ask him to go out. But as Mayil refuses and attacks them, the boys retaliate and Mayil is pushed down. Mayil starts to attack the boys, but the boys overpower and beat him. Angry and humiliated, Mayil leaves the place. When Naidu learns of this he is infuriated. Aachi goes to meet Naidu to apologise for the boys, but Naidu doesn't accept and keeps her hostage, till the boys get punished back. Naidu sends his group of men along with Mayil to beat the boys inside the mess, in front of everyone in the market, just like the boys did to him. The boys are forced, and they are targeted and mauled by Naidu's men. At one stage when Mayil tried to assault Yamini and Vanmathi, the boys start to retaliate and somehow get the upper hand. They then attack the men using weapons found in the market and drive them away. Unfortunately, Naidu gets further enraged. The boys take Mayil hostage and tells Naidu that if they release Aachi, they will release Mayil. All these incidents make Naidu angry on the boys, and he vows to take revenge on them. So he plans and attacks the boys once again, makes them unconscious, and separates them by sending them to different parts of the country.

The boys reunite after some struggles with the help of Vanmathi and decide to exact revenge on Naidu for making them lose their identities. They come back to the market and start their restaurant again. Naidu is surprised about this and goes to confront the boys, but they are saved by a cop. The boys decide to avenge their feelings by making Naidu lose the fear that people have on him and opposing him in the market elections. Naidu fears losing the election, and he decides to kill the boys and sends all his men to search for them. The boys hide, and since Naidu has sent all his men away, they realise that Naidu must be alone and they take him on. They see Naidu sleeping, and they cut off his hair and paste a coin his head, symbolising that he is dead. The next morning, Naidu sees this and is angered to the core. He directly goes to the mess and locks it from inside to kill the boys. The boys outpower him, tie him to a post, and strip him naked. They threaten to open the door, thus making his respect turn into shame. Naidu begs them not to do so and pleads them to kill him instead of showing him naked to the outside world. The boys then tell Naidu that the identity of a man is more important and he has finally learnt that. Naidu becomes guilt — ridden, and the boys are forgiven by him and vice versa. The boys continue to run the mess successfully. The movie emphasises that one's identity is important and worth fighting for and that forgiving and giving a chance to repent can permanently change lives. Then, it hints that Sithappa with Vanmathi and Puli with Yamini starting a romantic relationships.

Cast 

 Kishore DS as Pulli (Bruce Lee)
 Sree Raam as Settu
 Pandi as Sithappa
 Murugesh as Kuttimani
 Seetha as Vanmathi (ATM)
 Chandhini as Yaamini
 Madhusudhan Rao as Naidu (voice dubbed by Samuthirakani)
 Sujatha Sivakumar as Aachi
 R. K. Vijay Murugan as Mayilu
 Imman Annachi as Manthiravadhi
 Senthi Kumari as Naidu's wife
 Meenal as Naidu's niece
 Pasanga Sivakumar as Inspector Perumal
 Flower A. Manoharan as S. K.
 Sampath Ram

Special appearance in trailer
 T. Rajendar
 'Powerstar' Srinivasan
 Sam Anderson

Production 
Vijay Milton, who has been the cinematographer for films like Priyamudan, Autograph, Kaadhal and Vazhakku Enn 18/9, turned director with Azhagai Irukkirai Bayamai Irukkirathu. Goli Soda is his second directorial venture. The inspiration for the story came during an early morning visit to Koyambedu market. "I was passing through Koyambedu Market one morning, when I witnessed hundreds of young boys sleeping in its attics. That triggered my curiosity and I started researching them. I learnt that their world revolves only around this 'market', they do not have any other identity. Even when they get old, they indulge in activities like selling ganja and putting up petty tea shops inside the market. I immediately decided to make a film on them."

Filming took place in Chennai's Koyambedu market, Alappuzha in Kerala and Murudeshwara temple in Karnataka.

The film was shot entirely with Canon EOS 5D, a DSLR camera. Associate Director – Mr. Lenin

Release

Critical reception 
Goli Soda opened to critical acclaim.

Baradwaj Rangan wrote "The signature achievement of Goli Soda is its ruthless unmasking of how hollow most of our masala movies are, and how, with a little imagination, just a little, you can make a film which does not insult the audience" and went on to state, "I will be very surprised if there's a more entertaining, more inventive, more well-acted masala movie this year". The Times of India gave 3.5 stars out of 5 and said "Goli Soda IS a masala movie. But what sets it apart and even makes it one-of-a-kind is that its protagonists aren't grown-up 20-somethings but adolescents, early teens to be specific. There have been Hollywood films that have transposed the sensibilities of a regular genre movie to ones that have kids as the principal characters...but this is probably a first in Tamil cinema". Sify called it "a gutsy and outstanding film" and continued, "The film works due to the triumph of honest writing, freshness of its cast who does not have any star trappings, and the speed of the film. The backbone of the film is Pandiraj's script and Vijay Milton's directorial touches and the belief that everybody irrespective of his surroundings and upbringing has an identity". Cinemalead.com rated it with 4/5 stars and said "Overall if you prefer to watch a gutsy film which is different and unique from the routine Tamil cinema, go and watch Goli Soda which surely deserves a repeated viewing".

IANS gave it 4 out of 5 stars and said "Goli Soda is a slap in the face of heroism. It proves that the story is the real star of a film and it's precisely because of it that the entertainer emerges as a winner". Behindwoods rated it 3.25 out of 5 and said "Though there are exaggerated cinematic moments, Milton tells a good story under an unusual premise with engaging screenplay, sharp dialogues, good camerawork and interesting moments.". Indiaglitz also gave it a 3.25 rating and stated, "Vijay Milton has done the best justice to an offbeat story, in a clean entertainer that would impress all sorts of audience".

Box office 
The film opened poor response 30% - 45% occupancy on first day collected 60 lakhs at the box office. But later it got overwhelming improvement netted 2 crore on second day. The film grossed 4.33 crore in first weekend. The film collected 8 crore in first week at the box office. In chennai alone it collected 3 crore in its full run.

Soundtrack 

The soundtrack album was composed by S. N. Arunagiri. The lyrics were penned by Mani Amudhavan, Priyan and Gaana Bala. The background score was composed by Anoop Seelin, making his entry to Tamil cinema.

References

External links 
 

Films set in Chennai
Films shot in Chennai
Films shot in Alappuzha
Films shot in Karnataka
2014 films
2010s Tamil-language films
Films scored by S. N. Arunagiri
2014 action drama films
Indian action drama films
Tamil films remade in other languages